Pereiaslav Agreement, the 1654 Cossack Rada convened in Pereyaslav on the initiative of Bohdan Khmelnytsky to address the issue on mutual relations between Cossack Hetmanate and Muscovy
 Treaty of Pereiaslav (1630), between rebellious Cossack forces of Taras Fedorovych and Polish forces led by hetman Stanisław Koniecpolski
 Pereiaslav Articles, a 1659 treaty between Yuri Khmelnytsky, the son of Bohdan Khmelnytsky, and the Russian tsar, drastically limiting the Ukrainian (Cossack) autonomy